

2007-08 Top 3 Standings

Events summary

Final standings

References

Biathlon World Cup - Overall Women, 2008-09